The Mexican Open (currently sponsored by Telcel and HSBC and called the Abierto Mexicano Telcel presented by HSBC) is a men's professional tennis tournament played on outdoor hard courts, and usually held annually in late February and early March at the Arena GNP Seguros since 2022 and previously at the Fairmont Acapulco Princess, both in Acapulco, Mexico. It was played on outdoor red clay courts until 2013. The change to hard courts was introduced in 2014. The Mexican Open is part of the ATP Tour 500 series on the ATP Tour, and until 2020 was one of the WTA International tournaments on the WTA Tour.

The tournament was introduced on the ATP Tour in 1993, and began on the WTA Tour in 2001. It was held in Mexico City from 1993 to 1998, and once more in 2000, before being relocated to Acapulco in 2001. It was the closing leg of the four-ATP tournament Golden Swing. Starting in 2014, the Mexican Open's surface changed from clay to hard courts, serving as a lead-up to the first ATP Tour Masters 1000 event of the season in Indian Wells, United States. The winner traditionally receives a giant silver gourd trophy.

History

In the men's singles, Rafael Nadal (2005, 2013, 2020, 2022), David Ferrer (2010–2012, 2015) and Thomas Muster (1993–1996) hold the record for most overall titles (four each), with Muster holding the record for most consecutive wins (four).  On the women's side, Amanda Coetzer (2001, 2003), Flavia Pennetta (2005, 2008), Venus Williams (2009–10), Sara Errani (2012–13), and Lesia Tsurenko (2017–18) co-hold the record for most singles titles (two), Williams, Errani and Tsurenko being the only players to score two straight wins in Mexico. In the men's doubles, Donald Johnson (1996, 2000–01) has won the most titles (three), and co-holds with Michal Mertiňák (2008–09) and David Marrero (2012–13) the record for most back-to-back titles (two). In the women's doubles, María José Martínez Sánchez (2001, 2008–09) is the one holding the most titles (three) and shares with Nuria Llagostera Vives (2008–09) the record for most consecutive wins (two).

Men's singles

Women's singles

Men's doubles

{|class="wikitable" 
|-
!Year
!width="200"|Champions
!width="200"|Runners-up
!width="160"|Score
|-
|1993 ||  Leonardo Lavalle   Jaime Oncins ||  Horacio de la Peña   Jorge Lozano || 7–6, 6–4
|-
|1994 ||  Francisco Montana   Bryan Shelton ||  Luke Jensen   Murphy Jensen || 6–3, 6–4
|-
|1995 ||  Javier Frana   Leonardo Lavalle  ||  Marc-Kevin Goellner   Diego Nargiso || 7–5, 6–3
|-
|1996 ||  Donald Johnson   Francisco Montana  ||  Nicolás Pereira   Emilio Sánchez || 6–2, 6–4
|-
|1997 ||  Nicolás Lapentti   Daniel Orsanic ||  Luis Herrera   Mariano Sánchez || 4–6, 6–3, 7–6
|-
|1998 ||  Jiří Novák   David Rikl ||  Daniel Orsanic   David Roditi || 6–4, 6–2
|-
|style="background:#efefef"|1999 || colspan=3 align=center style="background:#efefef" | Not held
|-
|2000 ||  Byron Black   Donald Johnson  ||  Gastón Etlis   Martín Rodríguez || 6–3, 7–5
|-
|2001 ||  Donald Johnson    Gustavo Kuerten ||  David Adams   Martín García || 6–3, 7–6(7–5)
|-
|2002 ||  Bob Bryan   Mike Bryan ||  Martin Damm   David Rikl || 6–1, 3–6, [10–2]
|-
|2003 ||  Mark Knowles   Daniel Nestor ||  David Ferrer   Fernando Vicente || 6–3, 6–3
|-
|2004 ||  Bob Bryan    Mike Bryan  ||  Juan Ignacio Chela   Nicolás Massú || 6–2, 6–3
|-
|2005 ||  David Ferrer   Santiago Ventura ||  Jiří Vaněk   Tomáš Zíb || 4–6, 6–1, 6–4
|-
|2006 ||  František Čermák   Leoš Friedl ||  Potito Starace   Filippo Volandri || 7–5, 6–2
|-
|2007 ||  Potito Starace   Martín Vassallo Argüello ||  Lukáš Dlouhý   Pavel Vízner || 6–0, 6–2
|-
|2008 ||  Oliver Marach   Michal Mertiňák ||  Agustín Calleri   Luis Horna || 6–2, 6–7(3–7), [10–7]
|-
|2009 ||  František Čermák    Michal Mertiňák  ||  Łukasz Kubot   Oliver Marach || 4–6, 6–4, [10–7]
|-
|2010 ||  Łukasz Kubot   Oliver Marach  ||  Fabio Fognini   Potito Starace || 6–0, 6–0
|-
|2011 ||  Victor Hănescu   Horia Tecău ||  Marcelo Melo   Bruno Soares || 6–1, 6–3
|-
|2012 ||  David Marrero   Fernando Verdasco ||  Marcel Granollers   Marc López || 6–3, 6–4
|-
|2013 ||  Łukasz Kubot    David Marrero  ||  Simone Bolelli   Fabio Fognini || 7–5, 6–2
|-
|2014 ||  Kevin Anderson   Matthew Ebden ||  Feliciano López   Max Mirnyi || 6–3, 6–3
|-
|2015 ||  Ivan Dodig   Marcelo Melo ||  Mariusz Fyrstenberg   Santiago González || 7–6(7–2), 5–7, [10–3]
|-
|2016 ||  Treat Huey   Max Mirnyi ||  Philipp Petzschner   Alexander Peya || 7–6(7–5), 6–3
|-
|2017 ||  Jamie Murray   Bruno Soares ||  John Isner   Feliciano López || 6–3, 6–3
|-
|2018 ||  Jamie Murray    Bruno Soares  ||  Bob Bryan   Mike Bryan || 7–6(7–4), 7–5
|-
|2019 ||  Alexander Zverev   Mischa Zverev ||  Austin Krajicek   Artem Sitak || 2–6, 7–6(7–4), [10–5]
|-
|2020 ||  Łukasz Kubot    Marcelo Melo  ||  Juan Sebastián Cabal   Robert Farah || 7–6(8–6), 6–7(4–7), [11–9]
|-
|2021 ||  Ken Skupski   Neal Skupski ||  Marcel Granollers   Horacio Zeballos || 7–6(7–3), 6–4
|-
|2022 ||  Feliciano López   Stefanos Tsitsipas ||  Marcelo Arévalo    Jean-Julien Rojer || 7–5, 6–4 
|-
|2023 ||  Alexander Erler  Lucas Miedler ||  Nathaniel Lammons  Jackson Withrow ||  7–6(11–9), 7–6(7–3)
|}

Women's doubles

ATP points and prize money
For the 2020 edition the distribution of points and prize money was as follows:SinglesWTA points and prize money
For the 2020 edition the distribution of points and prize money was as follows:Singles'''

Notes

References

External links
Official website

 
Clay court tennis tournaments
WTA Tour
Recurring sporting events established in 1993
ATP Tour 500
Tennis tournaments in Mexico
Hard court tennis tournaments
1993 establishments in Mexico
Grand Prix tennis circuit
ATP Tour